J39 may refer to:
 Elongated pentagonal gyrobicupola, a Johnson solid (J39)
 General Electric J39, a proposed jet engine
 , a Hunt-class minesweeper of the Royal Navy
 LNER Class J39, a British steam locomotive class